Shagufta Rafique is an Indian film screen-writer and film director.

Biography

Shagufta was an adopted child. Her parents are unknown.  Her foster mother was in a relationship with a Kolkata based businessman, who left his second family unsupported after his death. His sudden death brought the family into poverty and Shagufta had to start supporting family at a young age of 11 by dancing at private parties. Her mother also trained her as a classical dancer. Aged 17, Rafique married a wealthy man to get some financial stability in her life, however, the union did not work well.. She finally broke up and turned to prostitution, before going on to work as a bar dancer to make a living. As a bar dancer she worked in Bombay before moving to Dubai. At the age of 25, one of her Pakistani fans who was 20 years her senior offered to marry her and Shagufta agreed, and he died before the marriage could happen.. This led her to writing, and she became a storyteller.

Shagufta initially joined Mahesh Bhatt's production company, Vishesh Films, where she wrote eleven films. After working for many films as a writer and screenwriter, she made her directorial debut with the Bengali action thriller film, Mon Jaane Na which was released on Holi 2019.

Filmography

Bengali

Hindi

Telugu

References

External links 
 

Film directors from Mumbai
Hindi-language film directors
Living people
1969 births